The ptyctodontids ("folded-teeth") are placoderms of the order Ptyctodontida, containing the family Ptyctodontidae. With their big heads, big eyes, reduced armor and long bodies, the ptyctodontids bore a superficial resemblance to modern day chimaeras (Holocephali).  Their armor was reduced to a pattern of small plates around the head and neck.  Like the extinct and related acanthothoracids, and the living and unrelated holocephalians, most of the ptyctodontids are thought to have lived near the sea bottom and preyed on shellfish.

On account of their radically reduced armor, some paleontologists have suggested that the Ptyctodontida were not actually placoderms, but actual holocephalians, some primitive group of elasmobranch fish, or even were the ancestors of the holocephalians, including the chimaeras.  Thorough anatomical examinations of whole fossil specimens reveal that the profound similarities between these two groups are actually very superficial.  The major differences between them were that holocephalians have shagreen on their skin and ptyctodontids did not, that the armored plates and scales of holocephalians are made of dentine, and the armored plates and scales of ptyctodontids were made of bone, the anatomy of the craniums of holocephalians is more similar to sharks, and that of ptyctodontids were more similar to those of other placoderms, and, most importantly, the holocephalians have true teeth, while the ptyctodonts had beak-like tooth-plates.

The Ptyctodontida were the only known group of placoderms that were recognizably sexually dimorphic, in that the males had hook-like growths on their pelvic fins that were analogous to the clasping organs found in male sharks, and chimaeras. Paleontologists believe that the males of the ancestral placoderm had pelvic claspers, but the claspers were lost in the evolutionary development of each of the placoderm orders, save for the ptyctodontids (there are too few whole specimens of the primitive Stensioella heintzi to tell if the males of that species had claspers or not).

Because they had reduced armor, the ptyctodontids were once thought to be the most primitive of the placoderms.  Indeed, there has been the idea that the placoderms had a gradient, of sorts, from the least armored, and most primitive forms, to the heavily armored, most advanced forms.  During the 1980s and '90's, ptyctodont skulls were compared with skulls from other orders.  From these analysises, this idea of a gradient from least armored to most armored in placoderms was discarded.  Now, the ptyctodonts are regarded as the sister group of the Arthrodira and Phyllolepida.

Timeline of genera

Gallery

References 

  (1996): The Rise of Fishes: 500 Million Years of Evolution. Johns Hopkins University Press, Baltimore. 

Early Devonian first appearances
Late Devonian animals
Late Devonian extinctions
Prehistoric fish orders
Monotypic vertebrate taxa